Saf ibn Sayyad, later known as Abdullah ibn Sa'id, was an alleged claimant of prophethood during the time of Islamic prophet Muhammad and his companions who later disappeared after the Ridda wars. Umar bin Khattab and even some scholars today speculate that he might be the Ad-Dajjal who would later come in this world as False Messiah.

Early life
He was born in an Arabian Jewish family. From his name, his father might be a fisherman, as Sayyad means fisherman in Arabic.

His hostility towards Muhammad since childhood led scholars to speculate that he is Ad-Dajjal.

Claims of prophethood in childhood
Ibn Sayyad claimed he was a prophet when he was on the threshold of adolescence, and was initially believed to be the False Messiah (Dajjal), as his characteristics were the same as those of the False Messiah:

It was narrated that Muhammad met Ibn Sayyad, at that time Ibn Sayyad was just at the threshold of adolescence. Muhammad said: "Don't you bear testimony to the fact that I am the Messenger of Allah?" Ibn Sayyad said: "I bear testimony that you are the Messenger of the illiterate." After Ibn Sayyad jests about being a prophet, `Umar ibn Khattab decided that the child deserved death and asked Muhammad for permission to execute him. Thereupon Muhammad said: "If he is that person [the Dajjal] who is in your mind, you will not be able to kill him, and if he is not, then killing will not do you any good."

Characteristics
Hanafi Islamic scholar Dr. Israr Ahmed referred a narration in which he said that Saf ibn Sayyad had the biological ability to watch and see from his back. Moreover, he was also quoted that:

In Sahih Muslim, some narrations also conclude that Saf ibn Sayyad had the ability to read people's minds.

Adulthood
Nafi' reported that Ibn `Umar met Ibn Sayyad (now known as Abdullah ibn Sa'id) and said to some of his friends: "You state that it was he (the Dajjal)." Ibn Sa'id said: "By Allah, it is not so". Ibn `Umar said: "You have not told me the truth; by Allah some of you informed me that he would not die until he would have the largest number of offspring and huge wealth and it is he about whom it is thought so."

However, Abu Sa`id al-Khudri reported: "Ibn Sa'id said to me something for which I felt ashamed. He said: I can excuse others; but what has gone wrong with you, O Companions of Muhammad, that you take me as Dajjal? Has Allah's Apostle (ﷺ) not said that he would be a Jew whereas I am a Muslim and he also said that he would not have children, whereas I have children, and he also said: verily, Allah has prohibited him to enter Mecca whereas I have performed Pilgrimage".

Due to these constant claims against him, Ibn Sa'id became depressed, stating: "I think I should take a rope and tie it to the tree and commit suicide because of the talks of the people." (Sahih Muslim 54:114)

Disappearance
Saf ibn Sayyad was last seen during the Battle of al-Harra, where the Umayyad Caliph Yazid I had sent a force to subjugate the city of Medina.

He reportedly disappeared during the battle and was never seen again.

See also
Al-Aswad Al-Ansi
List of people who disappeared
Musaylimah
Sajah
Tulayha

References

7th-century Arabs
7th-century Islam
Arab prophets
Missing person cases in Saudi Arabia
Self-declared messiahs